Slessor is a surname. Notable people with the surname include:

 Catherine Slessor Scottish architecture writer
 Frederick Slessor (1831–1905), British railway engineer
 John Slessor (1897–1975), Marshal of the Royal Air Force
 Kenneth Slessor (1901–1971), Australian poet
 Mary Slessor (1848–1915), Scottish missionary
 Elliot Slessor (born 1994), English snooker player

See also
 Slesser